Zulfadli Zainal Abidin (born 26 April 1988) is a Singaporean professional footballer who plays for the Geylang International in the S.League.

Club career
Zulfadli has previously played for S.League clubs Singapore U-17, Tampines Rovers FC, Home United Football Club and Young Lions.

Zulfadli came late to serious football, having initially kicked a ball around only with his friends and had done little beyond that until getting a chance at Bartley Secondary School.

He  must have shown promise as he was selected for the NFA Under 15, Under 16, Under 17 and Under 18 squads and also played a year for Tampines Rovers FC in their Prime League side.

He  had been spotted when appearing for Bartley Secondary School during Sec 2 when playing in a pre-season friendly against the Under 15 NFA side.

The coach at the time, Rajendran, liked what he saw of the then striker, who also played as a centre-back at Tampines Rovers FC, and based on his performance invited Zulfadli to play for his NFA Under 15s the following year.

In his Under 16 team the season after, Zulfadli played in left midfield under R. Suriamuthi and it seems this is the position he has leaned towards ever since.

After that V. Sundramoorthy had the budding midfielder under his care at the Young Lions.

Some of his team mates that year included Shahdan Sulaiman and Khairul Amri.

After two years there, Zulfadli was disappointed to learn that he was not being included for another season and was going to be without a club, prompting thoughts of even finishing with football.

It was then that Singapore Armed Forces FC stepped in and Richard Bok, who had taken advice from Zulfadli’s former coach Raj, handed Zulfadli a lifeline, since the player had almost resigned himself to being out of the S.League; having tasted that after a previous experience in the Prime League, he had no interest in dropping down to that level.

The appearance in the Warriors' AFC Champions League game in Japan against Kashima Antlers two years ago ranks as his career highlight.

National service came soon after the Kashima Antlers game and the only way he could continue in the S.League was by switching allegiances and moving to Home United FC.

Enlisting in the Singapore Civil Defence Force in October 2009, he found things difficult, juggling training at Clementi Stadium with his national service commitments.

Zulfadli suffered a serious hamstring injury, while jogging alone at the gym, and the hamstring problem affected both legs. He was advised to rest for six months and did not made it back until he played Woodlands Wellington FC on 22 June 2011 at left back and won 5-1. Having played against all of the big teams for Home United FC and things were going well until he suffered a Grade 3 MCL tear while playing Hougang United FC.

Zulfadli made only one appearance for them before the end of national service, as a substitute against Etoile FC in a Singapore Cup Quarter Final second-leg game at Queenstown Stadium, which he won 1-0.

Following his completion of national service, Zulfadli return to Singapore Armed Forces FC where the 23-year-old was on the bench against Home United FC, as the Warriors lost 4-0 on 16 Oct.

On his first start at the Hougang Stadium three days later, he justified coach Richard Bok's faith by netting the clincher in a 3-1 win with a cracking goal from 20 metres out on the left that left Fadhil Salim sprawling.

On 31 Oct, there was another goal to come for Zulfadli, this time off the bench, in a match at Bedok Stadium against Geylang United FC when the 83rd minute replacement netted the sixth goal in a 6-3 rout of the Eagles.

In 2015, Zulfadli signed for Tampines Rovers.

After a season with Tampines, Zulfadli returned to Warriors for the 2016 S.League campaign. He is also the captain of the team.

International career
Zulfadli was first called up to the national team as a replacement for Shaiful Esah in 2013. He made his international debut in 2013. He got called up frequently from 2014 to 2015 but did not make any appearance. Due to Noh Rahman's retirement from international football, after he was included in the squad for the 2016 AYA Bank Cup, he was called up as a replacement. He made his second appearance on 3 June 2016 against Myanmar in a 1-0 win, replacing Gabriel Quak in the 84th minute.

Career statistics

Club

. Caps and goals may not be correct.

 Young Lions is ineligible for qualification to AFC competitions in their respective leagues.

International caps

References

Singaporean footballers
Singapore international footballers
Warriors FC players
1988 births
Living people
Home United FC players
Tampines Rovers FC players
Singapore Premier League players
Young Lions FC players
Association football defenders
Association football midfielders